Manuel Campos Pinto (born 14 December 1938) is a Portuguese former footballer who played as central defender.

Club career
Born in Montijo, Setúbal District, Pinto started his professional career with S.L. Benfica. He was part of two Primeira Liga squads during his spell with the club, winning the 1960–61 edition but contributing only two matches to the feat.

The following 12 seasons, Pinto represented Vitória S.C. also of the top division. On 10 September 1969, he was on the starting XI for their first-ever game in European competition, against FC Baník Ostrava in the first round of the Inter-Cities Fairs Cup.

International career
Pinto played twice with the Portugal national team over a one-month period. He earned his first cap on 6 April 1969, in a 0–0 friendly draw with Mexico.

Personal life
Pinto's younger brother, Custódio, was also a footballer.

Honours
Benfica
Primeira Liga: 1960–61
Taça de Portugal: 1961–62

References

External links

1938 births
Living people
People from Montijo, Portugal
Sportspeople from Setúbal District
Portuguese footballers
Association football defenders
Primeira Liga players
S.L. Benfica footballers
Vitória S.C. players
Portugal international footballers